5 Aquarii is a single star in the zodiac constellation of Aquarius, located about 830 light years away from the Sun, based on parallax. 5 Aquarii is the Flamsteed designation. It is visible to the naked eye as a faint, blue-white hued star with an apparent visual magnitude of 5.55. This object is moving closer to the Earth with a heliocentric radial velocity of −3 km/s.

This is a suspected chemically peculiar star star with a stellar classification of B9 III, although Adelman et al. (2004) consider it to be a normal star with near-solar elemental abundances. It is relatively sharp-lined with a projected rotational velocity of 25 km/s. The star is radiating 318 times the luminosity of the Sun from its photosphere at an effective temperature of 11,200 K.

References

External links
 Image 5 Aquarii

B-type giants
Chemically peculiar stars
Suspected variables
Aquarius (constellation)
BD-06 5606
Aquarii, 005
198667
103005
7985